Saba is a 1929 Soviet silent drama film directed by Mikheil Chiaureli. It was made in the Georgian Soviet Socialist Republic.

Cast
 Aleksandre Jaliashvili as Saba  
 Veriko Anjaparidze as Maro, wife of Saba  
 L. Januashvili as Vakhtangi, son of Saba and Maro  
 Eka Chavchavadze as Olga

References

Bibliography 
 Georges Sadoul & Peter Morris. Dictionary of Film Makers. University of California Press, 1972.

External links 
 

1929 films
Soviet silent feature films
Soviet drama films
Silent feature films from Georgia (country)
Georgian-language films
Films directed by Mikheil Chiaureli
Soviet black-and-white films
1929 drama films
Drama films from Georgia (country)
Silent drama films
Soviet-era films from Georgia (country)